Trible is a surname. Notable persons with that surname include:
 Paul S. Trible Jr. (born 1946), an attorney and Republican politician from Virginia
 Phyllis Trible (born 1932), a feminist biblical scholar from Richmond, Virginia, United States